The Black Tom explosion was an act of sabotage by agents of the German Empire, to destroy U.S.-made munitions that were to be supplied to the Allies in World War I. The explosions, which occurred on July 30, 1916, in New York Harbor, killed four people and destroyed some $20,000,000 ($ million in  dollars) worth of military goods. This incident, which happened prior to U.S. entry into World War I, also  damaged the Statue of Liberty. It was one of the largest artificial non-nuclear explosions in history.

Black Tom Island 

The term "Black Tom" originally referred to an island in New York Harbor next to Liberty Island. The island was artificial, created by land fill around a rock of the same name, which had been a local hazard to navigation. Being largely built up from city refuse, it developed a reputation as an unseemly environmental hazard. On January 26, 1875, an accidental explosion killed four. By 1880, the island was transformed into a  promontory, and a causeway and railroad had been built to connect it with the mainland to use as a shipping depot. Between 1905 and 1916, the Lehigh Valley Railroad, which owned the island and causeway, expanded the island with land fill, and the entire area was annexed by Jersey City. A -long pier on the island housed a depot and warehouses for the National Dock and Storage Company. Black Tom Island is now part of Liberty State Park.

Black Tom was a major munitions depot for the northeastern United States. Until April 6, 1917, the United States was neutral in respect to World War I and its munitions companies earlier in the war could sell to any buyer. Due to the blockade of Germany by the Royal Navy, however, only the Allied Governments were able to purchase American munitions. As a result, Imperial Germany sent spies to the United States to disrupt by any means necessary the production and delivery of war munitions that were intended to kill German soldiers on the battlefields of the Great War.

Explosion 

All were waiting to be shipped to Russia. Jersey City's Commissioner of Public Safety, Frank Hague, later said he had been told the barge was "tied up at Black Tom to avoid a twenty-five dollar charge".

After midnight, a series of small fires were discovered on the pier. Some guards fled, fearing an explosion. Others attempted to fight the fires and eventually called the Jersey City Fire Department. At 2:08 am, the first and largest of the explosions took place, the second and smaller explosion occurring around 2:40 am. A notable location for one of the first major explosions was around the Johnson Barge No. 17, which contained 50 tons of TNT and 417 cases of detonating fuses.

The explosion was the equivalent of an earthquake measuring between 5.0 and 5.5 on the Richter scale and was felt as far away as Philadelphia. Some window panes in Times Square were shattered. The stained glass windows in St. Patrick's Church were destroyed. The outer wall of Jersey City's City Hall was cracked and the Brooklyn Bridge was shaken. People as far away as Maryland were awakened by what they thought was an earthquake.

On the island, the explosion destroyed more than one hundred railroad cars, thirteen warehouses, and left a  crater at the source of the explosion. The damage to the Statue of Liberty was estimated to be , and included damage to the skirt and torch.

There were four confirmed fatalities in the explosion: the barge captain, Jersey City Police Department officer James F. Doherty, Lehigh Valley Railroad chief of police Joseph Leyden, and ten-week-old infant Arthur Tosson. One contemporary newspaper report estimated up to seven deaths in the attack. Immigrants being processed at Ellis Island had to be evacuated to Lower Manhattan.

Investigation 

In the immediate aftermath of the explosion, two watchmen who had lit smudge pots to keep away mosquitoes were questioned by police but the police soon determined that the smudge pots had not caused the fire and that the blast had likely been an accident.  President Wilson remarked of the incident that it was "a regrettable incident at a private railroad terminal", and Edgar E. Clark of the Interstate Commerce Commission was dispatched to investigate.

Soon after the explosion, suspicion fell upon Michael Kristoff, a Slovak immigrant. Kristoff would later serve in the United States Army in World War I, but admitted to working for German agents (transporting suitcases) in 1915 and 1916 while the US was still neutral. According to Kristoff, two of the guards at Black Tom were German agents. 

It is likely that the bombing involved some of the techniques developed by German agents working for Ambassador Count Johann Heinrich von Bernstorff, who covertly acted as a spymaster while under German Foreign Office cover, and Captain Franz von Rintelen of the intelligence wing of the German Imperial Navy, using the cigar bombs developed by Dr. . von Rintelen used many resources at his disposal, including a large amount of money. von Rintelen used these resources to make generous cash bribes, one of which was notably given to Michael Kristoff in exchange for access to the pier. Suspicion at the time fell solely upon suspected German intelligence operatives Kurt Jahnke and Lothar Witzke, who are still judged as legally responsible. It is also believed that Michael Kristoff was responsible for planting and initiating the incendiary devices that led to the explosions.

Additional investigations by the Directorate of Naval Intelligence also found links to some members of the Irish republican Clan na Gael organization and far-left organizations. Irish socialist and labour union leader James Larkin asserted that he had not participated in sabotage, but admitted to having encouraged work stoppages and strike actions in munitions factories, in an affidavit to McCloy in 1934.

The United States did not have an established national intelligence service, other than diplomats and few military and naval attaches, making the investigation difficult. Without a formal intelligence service on the national level, the United States only had rudimentary communications security and no federal laws forbidding espionage or sabotage except during wartime, making the connections to the saboteurs and accomplices almost impossible to track.

Aftermath 
This attack was one of many during the German sabotage campaign against the neutral United States, and it is notable for its contribution to the shift of public opinion against Germany, which eventually resulted in American support to enter World War I.

The Russian government sued the Lehigh Valley Railroad Company operating the Black Tom Terminal on grounds that lax security (there was no entrance gate; the territory was unlit) permitted the loss of their ammunition and argued that due to the failure to deliver them the manufacturer was obliged by the contract to replace them.

The Lehigh Valley Railroad, advised by John J. McCloy, sought damages against Germany under the Treaty of Berlin from the German-American Mixed Claims Commission. The Mixed Claims Commission declared in 1939 that Imperial Germany had been responsible and awarded $50 million (the largest claim) in damages, which Nazi Germany refused to pay. The issue was finally settled in 1953 for $95 million (interest included) with the Federal Republic of Germany. The final payment was made in 1979.

The Statue of Liberty's torch was closed to the public following the explosion, due to structural damages. Access was not opened even after the 1984–1986 restoration which included repairs to the arm and installation of a new gold-plated copper torch.

Legacy 
The Black Tom explosion resulted in the establishment of domestic intelligence agencies for the United States. The then Police Commissioner of New York, Arthur Woods, argued, "The lessons to America are clear as day. We must not again be caught napping with no adequate national intelligence organization. The several federal bureaus should be welded into one and that one should be eternally and comprehensively vigilant." The explosion also played a role in how future presidents responded to military conflict. President Franklin D. Roosevelt used the Black Tom explosion as part of his rationale for the internment of Japanese Americans following the attack on Pearl Harbor in 1941.  In an interview with Jules Witcover, McCloy noted that as assistant secretary of the navy under Wilson, Roosevelt "knew all about Black Tom."  At the time President Roosevelt said to him: "We don't want any more Black Toms."

The incident also influenced public safety legislation. The sabotage techniques used by Germany, and the United States' declaration of war on Germany, led to the creation of the Espionage Act, which passed by Congress in late 1917. Landfill projects later made Black Tom Island part of the mainland, and it was incorporated into Liberty State Park. The former Black Tom Island is at the end of Morris Pesin Drive in the southeastern corner of the park, where a plaque marks the spot of the explosion. A circle of U.S. flags complements the plaque, which stands east of the visitors' center.

The inscription on the plaque reads:
Explosion at Liberty!

On July 30, 1916 the Black Tom munitions depot exploded rocking New York Harbor and sending residents tumbling from their beds.

The noise of the explosion was heard as far away as Maryland and Connecticut. On Ellis Island, terrified immigrants were evacuated by ferry to the Battery. Shrapnel pierced the Statue of Liberty (the arm of the Statue was closed to visitors after this). Property damage was estimated at $20 million. It is not known how many died.

Why the explosion? Was it an accident or planned? According to historians, the Germans sabotaged the Lehigh Valley munitions depot in order to stop deliveries being made to the British who had blockaded the Germans in Europe.

You are walking on a site which saw one of the worse [sic] acts of terrorism in American history.

A stained-glass window at Our Lady of Czestochowa Catholic church memorialized the victims of the attack.

See also 
 List of German sponsored acts of terrorism during WWI
 Anton Dilger
 Largest artificial non-nuclear explosions
 List of accidents and incidents involving transport or storage of ammunition
 Kingsland explosion
 SS El Estero, fire and averted explosion near same location in World War II
 United States in World War I
 Zimmermann Telegram
 Halifax explosion

References

Bibliography 
 
 
 Ron Semple (2015). Black Tom: Terror on the Hudson. Top Hat Books, p. 514.

External links 

 Black Tom Explosion (1916), Liberty State Park
 Sabotage in New York Harbor, Smithsonian.com
 The Black Tom Explosion, History.com
 GenDisasters Black Tom 1916

1916 crimes in the United States
1916 in New Jersey
Acts of sabotage
Crimes in New Jersey
Disasters in New York City
Explosions in 1916
Explosions in New Jersey
Hindu–German Conspiracy
History of Jersey City, New Jersey
July 1916 events
Mass murder in 1916
People killed in intelligence operations
Port of New York and New Jersey
State-sponsored terrorism
Terrorist incidents in the United States in the 1910s
United States home front during World War I